Polina Sergeyevna Gagarina (born 27 March 1987) is a Russian singer and songwriter. She represented Russia in the Eurovision Song Contest 2015 with "A Million Voices" where she finished second with 303 points. In doing so, she became the first second placed finisher to exceed 300 points. Gagarina also participated in the Chinese reality-competition Singer in 2019, where she was one of the finalists.

She was the tenth-highest Russian earner on Instagram and YouTube in 2021, with net revenue of about 6 million US dollars from 8.9 million subscribers.

Biography 
Polina Gagarina was born in Moscow, but spent most of her youth in Greece. Her mother was a ballet dancer. In 1993, Gagarina's father died and her mother decided to move back to Russia, but they soon moved back to Greece and settled in Athens. After completing her education, she moved to Saratov to live with her grandmother. Besides her native language Russian, she is also fluent in Greek and English.

Career

2003–07: Poprosi u oblakov
In 2003, Gagarina competed in season two of Star Factory, a Russian reality singing competition. She performed several songs by Maxim Fadeev and went on to win the show, but refused to work with Fadeev after her victory. After winning Star Factory, Gagarina was invited to perform in the group Playgirls. The group received a recording contract with ARS Records, but ultimately disbanded. She later released the singles "Kolybelnaya", "Morning", "Ya tvoya", "Pomnyu", and "Ya tebya ne proshchu nikogda". Her debut album Poprosi u oblakov was released in 2007.

2008–12: O sebe
In 2008, Gagarina released the single "Komu, zachem?", a duet with Russian singer Irina Dubtsova. In March 2010, her second studio album O sebe was released. In 2012, Gagarina started to collaborate with Russian-Georgian producer Konstantin Meladze. With Meladze she recorded four singles: "Spektakl okonchen" ("The Play Is Over"), "Net" ("No"), "Navek" ("Forever") and "Shagay" ("Stride").

2015–16: Eurovision Song Contest and 9

On 9 March 2015, it was revealed that Gagarina would represent Russia in the Eurovision Song Contest 2015 with the song "A Million Voices". Gagarina placed first in the first semi-final with 182 points, before coming second in the Grand Final of the contest, ending up with 303 points. This was the fourth highest overall points total of all time and she became the first non-winning participant to exceed 300 points. On 25 July 2015, she performed "A Million Voices" as the closing song of the 2018 FIFA World Cup qualifying draw in Saint Petersburg, shown on television worldwide. On 9 August 2015, she performed at the closing ceremony of the 2015 World Aquatics Championships in Kazan. She was a coach in the Russian reality talent show The Voice in seasons four and five. In September 2016, her third studio album 9 was released. This album peaked at number one on the Russia iTunes charts.

2019–present: Singer 2019 

On 1 February 2019, it was revealed that Gagarina participated in Chinese' reality competition Singer 2019, also known as the seventh season of I Am a Singer, entering under the substitute singer status on the fourth week. Gagarina was the third European contestant to participate after season six's winner Jessie J (United Kingdom) and Kristian Kostov (Bulgaria), who participated in season seven alongside her. Gagarina achieved three top placements on the first five-week of shows before finishing last in her sixth show, which was the Challenge round; Gagarina would have been eliminated per the competition rules but was instead saved after the Challenger of the week was unsuccessful in beating a majority (4) of the seven singers. On 22 March, she was temporarily given a bye after reporting to the media that she sustained a muscle injury during rehearsals. Despite her injury, she eventually ranked in the top three during the following week's round, called the Breakout round (a round featured previously eliminated contestants, substitute singers, except withdrawn and non-competing singers), where she became one of the seven finalists eligible for the title of Singer 2019 winner. In the Finals Rush Hour, she performed a duet with Chinese singer Geng Sihan, singing the song "Shallow". In the first round of the final, she sung "We Are the World" alongside Kazakhstan's Junior Eurovision Song Contest 2018 participant Daneliya Tuleshova, Filipino-Canadian singer Darren Espanto and Chinese rapper Air Ari. She was, however, was knocked out that round.

For season eight of the Voice in 2019, she rejoined as a coach. Also, for the first time on The Voice Kids, she was a coach for season seven.

In 2021, she teamed up with fellow Eurovision 2015 contestant Måns Zelmerlöw to record the official song, "Circles and Squares", for the 2021 World Figure Skating Championships. It was released on 21 February 2021.

On 18 March 2022, Gagarina sang at a pro-government rally held at the Luzhniki Stadium in Moscow celebrating the eighth anniversary of the annexation of Crimea by the Russian Federation from Ukraine and endorsing Russia's invasion of Ukraine that started the previous month. She was subsequently banned from entering Estonia and Latvia, along with a list of 24 other Russian artists who had expressed their support for the Russian government's actions. Her concert, scheduled in February 2023 in Almaty, Kazakhstan, was cancelled after online protest in Kazakhstan over her support of Russian's military operation. The Presidential Administration of Russia put Gagarina on the list of singers who were recommended to be invited to state-sponsored events.

Personal life
On 25 August 2007, Gagarina married Russian actor Pyotr Kislov. She gave birth to their son, Andrey, on 14 October 2007. They divorced on 31 March 2010. She married photographer Dmitry Iskhakov on 9 September 2014. In April 2017, she gave birth to their daughter, Miya. The couple split in 2021.

Discography

 Poprosi u oblakov (2007)
 O sebe (2010)
 9 (2016)

Filmography

See also
Russia in the Eurovision Song Contest 2015

References

External links

Polina Gagarina Facebook
Polina Gagarina VKontakte
Polina Gagarina YouTube
Polina Gagarina Forbes

Russian National Music Award winners
Russian nationalists
Nationalist musicians
Anti-Ukrainian sentiment in Russia
21st-century Russian actresses
21st-century Russian singers
21st-century Russian women singers
Eurovision Song Contest entrants of 2015
Fabrika Zvyozd
English-language singers from Russia
Russian-language singers
Actors from Saratov
Eurovision Song Contest entrants for Russia
Russian expatriates in Greece
Russian pop singers
1987 births
Living people
Moscow Art Theatre School alumni
Winners of the Golden Gramophone Award
Musicians from Saratov
Musicians from Athens
Fifa World Cup ceremonies performers